Zaima Beleño (born 3 October 1932) is an Panameñan singer, actress, dancer and vedette. Born in Panama, she traveled to Cuba as a young child.

Movies
1966: Ritmo, amor y juventud 
1967: Mi secretaria está loca, loca, loca 
1968: Humo de marihuana 
1969: Deliciosamente amoral

Songs

Theatre
 1962: El festival del Maipo
 1964: Proceso a la revista
 1967: Es la frescura
 1968: Minifalditis
 1968: Las 40 primaveras
 1968: Les cantamos las cuarenta
 1971: Maiporema

External links

References

1932 births
Argentine people of Panamanian descent
Argentine vedettes
20th-century Argentine women singers
Argentine female dancers
20th-century births
Possibly living people